Chertok is a village in Sapotskin possoviet, Hrodna district, Hrodna Voblast, Belarus.

It is situated by the Augustów Canal. A sluice which used to be by the village was destroyed during World War II. It was reconstructed in 2000s.

The village used to be within the Poland-Belarus border zone of restricted travel. In 2000s this restriction was lifted to enhance the development of tourism in the  area.

References

Villages in Belarus